Chanya Joyce Dorothy Button (born on 25 December 1986) is an English director and screenwriter. After studying at RADA and learning the ropes in the assistant directors' department on the Harry Potter franchise, she directed two feature films, Burn Burn Burn (2015) and Vita & Virginia (2018), the latter of which she also co-wrote. She then moved on to television, directing the 2019 period dramas World on Fire and The Spanish Princess, as well as an episode of Doctor Who, set to air in November 2023.

Early life and education 
Button was born in London on 25 December 1986. Her father is Roy Button, former executive vice-president and managing director of Warner Bros. Productions in the UK, who has worked behind the camera on over 300 films and was awarded an OBE in 2009 for services to the film industry. She therefore grew up on film sets and her earliest memories are of "wandering through elaborate film sets, spending whole weekends sitting on the back of a camera truck watching the machine of a film crew whir around me".

Button studied English Literature at the University of Oxford from 2005 to 2008. At the age of 18, she took part in the Royal Court Young Writers' Programme. During that time, she started directing theatre, choosing productions that aligned with the literature she was studying at Oxford. She gained experience as an assistant director at the Bush Theatre, the Tricycle Theatre and Shakespeare's Globe.

After graduating, she worked for the UK Film Council Film Fund in London, and then, shortly after, moved to Los Angeles to undertake work in the creative department at Warner Bros. Button also worked extensively as a runner and assistant director on big-budget features shot in the UK, notably on many Harry Potter films, Sherlock Holmes (2009) and Edge of Tomorrow (2014). In 2010, she received a master's degree in Theatre Directing from the Royal Academy of Dramatic Art.Button has cited Tim Burton as her favourite director and listed epic '70s and '80s films like Empire of the Sun (1987), Gandhi (1982) and the Indiana Jones instalments among some of her absolute favourites. She once explained that she finds the way those films were made before huge advances in visual effects, CGI and the raft of technological support that the filmmakers use today "utterly romantic and inspirational".

Career 
She started her career as a director with three short films, written by Sex Education executive producer Siân Robins-Grace. Those included Frog/Robot (2011) starring Charlie Covell, Fire (2012) starring Richard Lintern as Charles Dickens and Charlotte Randle as his wife Catherine, and Alpha: Omega (2013) starring Sebastian Armesto. In 2012, her work was selected as part of the Directors Guild of America's New Directors to Watch showcase, and she also shot the music video for Matt Cardle's single "Anyone Else".

Button's debut feature film, the road-trip black comedy Burn Burn Burn, premiered at the BFI London Film Festival in October 2015 and was later acquired by Netflix. It was nominated for the Discovery Award at the 18th British Independent Film Awards, for an outstanding debut feature, and won the Grand Prix at the 7th Odesa International Film Festival in Ukraine. The Observer's film critic Wendy Ide concluded, "Burn Burn Burn is nicely acted and emotionally authentic. Button shows real promise as a director".

Her second feature was the biographical romantic drama Vita & Virginia (2018), detailing the relationship between Vita Sackville-West (Gemma Arterton) and Virginia Woolf (Elizabeth Debicki) that culminated with the latter's writing of the novel Orlando: A Biography. Speaking about the inspiration behind the film that she also co-wrote with actress Eileen Atkins, Button said, "I have loved Virginia Woolf forever, since I could read! She taught me how to think about everything, she's the reason I became a director." Vita & Virginia received its world premiere at the 43rd Toronto International Film Festival and then went on to be the opening night film for both the 43rd Frameline Film Festival in San Francisco and the 33rd BFI Flare in London. Debicki's portrayal of Woolf was recognised with a nomination for Best Supporting Actress at the 22nd British Independent Film Awards.

Button then moved on to television work, directing two episodes of the BBC One war drama World on Fire (2019), dealing with the Dunkirk evacuation and the Nazi occupation of Paris, as well as several episodes of the Starz limited historical drama The Spanish Princess (2020) and the Acorn TV crime drama Whitstable Pearl (2021). In 2022, she directed the third 60th anniversary special episode of the BBC's science fiction television series Doctor Who, written by Russell T Davies and starring David Tennant and Catherine Tate. It is set to be aired on BBC One in the UK and on Disney+ internationally in November 2023.

Filmography

Film

Television

Awards and nominations

References

External links 

 
 
 Chanya Button at British Comedy Guide

Living people
British theatre directors
People from London
1986 births
English women film directors
English screenwriters
English-language film directors
Film directors from London
Alumni of RADA
Alumni of the University of Oxford
British film producers
British women film producers
British television directors
English television directors
British women screenwriters
English female screenwriters